Bwalya is a common name used in various African countries, especially in Zambia.

People with the surname
Benjamin Bwalya (1961–1999), Zambian football manager and player
Chanda Bwalya (born 1986), Zambian football player
Felix Bwalya (1970–1997), Zambian boxer
Gillan Bwalya (born 1988), Zambian IM chess player
Hastings Bwalya (born 1985), Zambian boxer
Joel Bwalya (born 1972), Zambian football manager and former player
Johnson Bwalya (born 1967), Zambian former football player
Kalusha Bwalya (born 1963), Zambian former football player; former president of the Football Association of Zambia
Larry Bwalya (born 1995), Zambian football player
Lilian Bwalya (born 1974), Zambian sprinter
Simon Bwalya (born 1985), Zambian football player
Walter Bwalya (born 1995), Congolese football player

People with the middle name
Alexander Bwalya Chikwanda (born 1938), Zambian politician
Christopher Bwalya Yaluma (born 1952), Zambian Minister of Commerce, Trade and Industry
Geoffrey Bwalya Mwamba (born 1959), Zambian businessman and politician
William Bwalya Miko (born 1961), Zambian painter

People with the given name
Bomb$hell Grenade (Bwalya Sophie Chibesakunda) (born 1987), Zambian rapper and singer
Zambian given names
Zambian surnames